General elections were held in the Gambia on 4 and 5 April 1977. They were won by the ruling People's Progressive Party, which claimed 29 of the 35 elected seats. There were 216,234 registered voters.

Results

Parliamentary elections in the Gambia
1977 in the Gambia
Gambia, The
April 1977 events in Africa
Election and referendum articles with incomplete results